Gale J. Young (1912–1990) was an American engineer, mathematical physicist, biophysicist, and applied mathematician. He is known as a pioneer of nuclear engineering and as one of the namesakes of the Eckart-Young theorem in linear algebra.

Education and career
He graduated in 1933 with a bachelor's degree in electrical engineering from the Milwaukee School of Engineering. At the University of Chicago he became in 1933 a graduate student in physics and received in 1936 a master's degree in mathematical physics. He continued to be affiliated with the University of Chicago until 1940 when he became the head of the physics and mathematics departments at Olivet College in Michigan. In early 1942 he returned to Chicago to work in Eugene Wigner's Theoretical Group developing nuclear reactors. Wigner claimed that Gale Young was his "main helper in 1942 in designing a nuclear pile cooled by water." From 1942 to 1946 Young was a research associate on the Manhattan Project at the University of Chicago's Metallurgical Laboratory (Met Lab). He later shared the patent for the design of water-cooled nuclear reactors. In 1946 he joined Wigner at the Clinton Laboratories, which was renamed Clinton National Laboratory in late 1947 and again renamed in January 1948 as Oak Ridge National Laboratory (ORNL). In 1948 Young and John R. Menke (1919–2009) founded Nuclear Development Associates (NDA), Inc., the first privately owned nuclear firm. Menke was the president and Young was the research director. When NDA was taken over by the United Nuclear Company, Young remained with the company until 1962. In 1962 he returned to ORNL as an assistant laboratory director, working on non-military applications of nuclear energy, especially desalination of seawater.

Selected publications
 (statement and proof of the Eckart-Young theorem)

 (See Julius Bernstein.)

References 

1912 births
1990 deaths
People from Berrien County, Michigan
Manhattan Project people
Oak Ridge National Laboratory people
Milwaukee School of Engineering alumni
University of Chicago alumni
20th-century American physicists
21st-century American physicists
American nuclear physicists
American nuclear engineers